Theory of a Deadman is the debut by the band Theory of a Deadman released in 2002.

Album information
The album contained the hit single "Make Up Your Mind". It also featured the singles "Nothing Could Come Between Us", "Point to Prove" and "The Last Song," (which was originally called "Theory of a Deadman"), both of which were solely written by Tyler Connolly, the band's lead singer. The album bears a Parental Advisory label due to expletives in "Invisible Man", "Any Other Way", and "Confession". A clean version was released that removed the expletives. The track ‘Invisible Man’ was also featured on the 2002 Spider-Man film soundtrack.

The album received mixed reviews from critics but sold very well. It would later certified Platinum in Canada as well as charting at number 85 on the US Rock Albums chart.

Track listing

2009 Special Edition

Personnel
Tyler Connolly - lead vocals, lead guitar
Dave Brenner - rhythm guitar, backing vocals
Dean Back - bass, backing vocals
Tim Hart - drums, backing vocals
Danny Craig - drums on "What You Deserve"

Year-end charts

Single Charts

References 

2002 debut albums
604 Records albums
Theory of a Deadman albums
Albums produced by Joey Moi